Kobi Nachtailer (born 9 November 1978) is an Israeli former professional footballer who played as a defender. He was the first Israeli to play an official match for a Romanian football club.

International career
On 9 August 1994, Nachtailer made his debut for the Israel U16 team against the Hungary U16 in a competition hosted by the Hungarian Football Federation. After that he had 57 games in the U16 to U18 national teams.

External links

Living people
1978 births
Israeli Jews
Israeli footballers
Association football defenders
Hapoel Tel Aviv F.C. players
Maccabi Sha'arayim F.C. players
Beitar Be'er Sheva F.C. players
Hapoel Petah Tikva F.C. players
Hapoel Kfar Saba F.C. players
Maccabi Tel Aviv F.C. players
VfL Osnabrück players
Hapoel Nof HaGalil F.C. players
FC Vaslui players
Liga Leumit players
Israeli Premier League players
Liga I players
Israeli expatriate footballers
Expatriate footballers in Germany
Expatriate footballers in Romania
Israeli expatriate sportspeople in Germany
Israeli expatriate sportspeople in Romania